The Tenth Straw is a 1926 Australian silent film heavily inspired by the novel For the Term of His Natural Life. Little is known of the director and cast, but most of the film survives today.

Plot
Aristocrat Bruce Lowe is convicted for a crime he did not commit and is transported from England to Australia. An army officer, Matthew Marr, pretends to be a friend of Lowe's to gain access to his fortune and seduce his sister, Marie. On board ship, Lowe stands up to a bully and gains a friend in Richard Groves. Lowe escapes from prison, and heads to the bush. Some aboriginals discover a goldfield. Lowe proves his innocence, and Marr is arrested.

Cast
Peggy Paul as Marie Lowe
Ernest Lauri as Bruce Lowe
James Cornell as Matthew Marr
Jack Fisher as Richard Groves
Syd Everett as Bully Carey
Robert Ball as Tiddley Harris
Robert G. McAnderson as Major Orville

Reception
Contemporary reviews noted the similarities of the story to For the Term of His Natural Life.

References

External links

The Tenth Straw at the National Film and Sound Archive

1926 films
Australian drama films
Australian silent feature films
Australian black-and-white films
1926 drama films
Silent drama films
1920s English-language films